Ouellette is a name of French origin common among French Canadians. It also exists in such forms as Ouellet.

People with the surname
André Ouellet, Canadian politician and public servant
Bella Ouellette (1886–1945), Canadian actress
Caroline Ouellette, Canadian ice hockey player
Fernand Ouellet, Canadian poet, novelist and writer
Guy Ouellette, Canadian police officer and politician
Jennifer Ouellette, Author, skeptic
 Jennifer Ouellette, New York-based milliner
Jerry Ouellette, Ontario politician
Joseph R. Ouellette, United States Army soldier and Medal of Honor recipient 
Madeleine Ouellette-Michalska, Canadian writer
Maryse Ouellet, Canadian glamour model and professional wrestler
Pierre Ouellette, American science-fiction author
Rose Ouellette, Canadian actress

Places
Ouellette, Ontario, Canada
Observation Post Ouellette, Joint Security Area, Korean Demilitarized Zone

See also
Ouellet